Raving Rabbids: Travel in Time is a party video game developed and published by Ubisoft for the Wii. It was released in North America on November 21, 2010, in Europe on November 26, 2010, in Australia on November 25, 2010 and in Japan on January 27, 2011. It is the fifth installment in the Rabbids series and, unlike the previous entry, Rabbids Go Home, it returns to the party game genre.

Plot summary

Wii version
The Rabbids use a time machine (which looks like a washing machine) to go through different times to change human history According to the trailer, first they go to The Prehistory in 10,000 BC and help a caveman discover fire, but end up giving him a lighter. Then they go to middle-aged Ancient Egypt in 2500 BC to disturb work on the Sphinx and make the nose fall off. And last, they go to Middle Ages in 520 but they end up underground holding down the legendary sword Excalibur when Arthur tries to pull it off the stone, but he gives up and leaves. When the Rabbids leave, Grannie ended up pulling the sword instead of Arthur.

In the intro for the game, a Rabbid is seen inside the washing machine/time machine altering prehistoric times, ancient Egypt, Middle Ages, Vienna in 1803 Beethoven's composition of the Fifth Symphony and Street Punk in 1980s a Punk Subculture, before smashing a vase in the modern day. The player then teams up with the Rabbid to mess with history (by accessing paintings related to each minigame) in order to repair the time machine (which was damaged on the trips to the aforementioned time periods). Upon altering time and accessing the golden washing machine, the Rabbid and the player are warped forward to the year 4096 A.D where Professor Barranco 3 (the ultra-intelligent Rabbid commander from Rayman Raving Rabbids 2) is drilling various Rabbids to use time machines to take absolute control over the space-time continuum. However, the player's Rabbid literally pulls the plug on one of the machines and causes all the time machines to disappear. This action inadvertently initiates a time paradox (which results in a sped-up version of the game intro) before ending up back in the museum.

Nintendo 3DS version
Taking place after the events of the Wii version of Raving Rabbids Travel In Time, the Rabbids are playing in the museum, when the same Time Machine appears, this time containing a Rabbid with a duck ring. After the Rabbids fight for the duck ring, the player and the Rabbid get warped to the past, in which the player once again teams up with the Rabbid to get back to the Present while making mess of history again. 
The game's ending shows the Rabbid the player teamed up with finding a refrigerator, in which the Rabbid attempts to use it as a Time Machine, but he only put some stuff on himself, and is zapped by a lighting spark, and the credits roll.

Setting
The setting is a history museum. From there, the Rabbids can play quiz, singing, and dancing games. They can also customize their Rabbids with historical costumes. The Rabbids can also go into museum's main areas: the Bouncearium, Shootarium, Flyarium, Runarium and Hookarium; to ruin history with their Time Washing Machine.

Gameplay
Gameplay revolves around several minigames for up to four players (with computer AI controlling unused players) set during various segments of time. Some levels feature co-operative play, such as a level where two players are tethered by toilet paper. Ubisoft has stated this game intends to be 'waggle-free', and rather than having players shake the controller as hard as they can, the designers hoped to create mini-games with more depth.

Each minigame is set in one of five different sections of a history museum: the Bouncearium, involving maneuvering the Rabbids through side-scrolling platformer minigames; the Shootarium, using first-person shooting style minigames; the Flyarium, allowing Rabbids to fly and compete against one another in races and scavenger hunts; the Runarium, which has two teams race or collect items; and the Hookarium, which is themed around the use of the WiiMotion Plus accessory as a fishing rod.

Worlds

Bouncearium
Titanic in 1912
Wrangel Island in 400, 000 BC
Hollywood in 1923
Ford Creates Assembly Line in 1908
Cretaceous Period in 100, 000 BC

Shootarium
Georgia Gold Rush in 1799
First Man on the Moon in 1969
Ancient Egypt in 2500 BC
Ancient Rome in 44 BC

Flyarium
Kite Experiment in 1752
Apollo–Soyuz Test Project in 1975
Mount Rushmore in 1939
Discovery of America in 1492
First Flight in 1903
Italian Renaissance in 1506

Runarium
Medieval Britain in 520
The Bank (Great Depression) in 1929
American Old West in 1861
Cave Painting in 32, 000 BC
Cambridge in 1761

Hookarium
Jurassic Period in 400, 000, 000 BC
Paris in 1885
Stone Wheel in 3000 BC

Nintendo 3DS version
A Nintendo 3DS version of this game was released as a platform game in 2011. This version is titled as Rabbids: Travel in Time 3D in North America, and simply Rabbids 3D in Europe. It has only 4 historical periods containing 60 maps.

The player must progress in bonus-filled levels, fight some enemies and do jumps or slippery slopes for dynamic action. The advantage of 3D in Rabbids 3D is to provide an immediate gaming pleasure without complication or innovation. There are many checkpoints, and lives and energy points (rolls of toilet paper, spheres of force) are generously distributed, so the player is never discouraged by the difficulties present in the game.

The title was later re-released in a compilation pack called Rayman & Rabbids Family Pack, alongside Rayman Origins and Rabbids Rumble. The pack was released exclusively in Europe on October 2, 2014.

In return, the game received mixed to negative reviews, with the criticism focused in the lack of originality, low difficulty and repetitive action.

Plot
Taking place after the events of the Wii version of Raving Rabbids Travel In Time, the Rabbids are playing in the museum, when the same Time Machine appears, this time containing a Rabbid with a duck ring. After the Rabbids fight for the duck ring, the player and the Rabbid get warped to the past, in which the player once again teams up with the Rabbid to get back to the Present while making mess of history again. The game's ending shows the Rabbid the player teamed up with finding a refrigerator, in which the Rabbid attempts to use it as a Time Machine, but he only put some stuff on himself, and is zapped by a lighting spark, and the credits roll.

Reception

Raving Rabbids: Travel in Time was met with mixed reviews. Nintendo Power gave the game a 6.5, while VideoGamer gave it a score of 8/10. Official Nintendo Magazine criticized the game, giving it a 40/100. IGN reviewed the game, praising the graphics and the museum hub included, and gave the game a 7/10. Other websites, such as Nintendo Life and GameStyle, gave it the same score as well. TheBitBlock.com was more positive, giving the game 8/10, praising the inclusion of online play, graphics, and multiplayer, but criticized the disappointing use of WiiMotionPlus, the shooting games, and the historical theme of the game. TheBitBlock.com called it "a party game that offers up content that you've never seen before in the party genre." The game was not well received by fans of the series and was criticized for the return to the party roots.

References

External links
Official Global website

2010 video games
Party video games
Rabbids
Ubisoft games
Platform games
Wii Wi-Fi games
Nintendo 3DS games
Wii MotionPlus games
Nintendo 3DS eShop games
Nintendo Wi-Fi Connection games
Dinosaurs in video games
Video games about rabbits and hares
Video games about time travel
Video games developed in France
Video games developed in Morocco